James N. Loehlin is an American literary historian and writer.

He is from Austin, Texas, United States. He is Shakespeare at Winedale Regents Professor of English and director of the Shakespeare at Winedale program at University of Texas at Austin. He was a Marshall Scholar at Oxford, and earned joint Ph.D. in Drama and Humanities at Stanford. He taught in the Drama Department at Dartmouth College. He is the son of the Psychology Professor and Behavior Geneticist John Loehlin.

Awards
Harry Ransom Teaching Award
Chad Oliver Teaching Award in Plan II
President's Associates Teaching Award

Works
The Cambridge Introduction to Chekhov (Cambridge Introductions to Literature)
Henry IV: Parts 1 and 2 (The Shakespeare Handbooks)
Chekhov: The Cherry Orchard (Plays in Production)

References

Living people
Alumni of the University of Oxford
American literary historians
American male non-fiction writers
Dartmouth College faculty
Stanford University alumni
University of Texas at Austin faculty
Writers from Austin, Texas
Year of birth missing (living people)
Historians from Texas